Yellow Fever is a play by R. A. Shiomi, which takes place on Powell Street in Japantown, Vancouver, a gathering place for the local Japanese-Canadian culture. Set in the 1970s, the Sam Spade-like main character, Sam Shikaze, must work to unravel the mysteries that surround him. First produced by the Pan Asian Repertory Theatre in 1982, it received positive reviews and had a successful run off-Broadway.

Plot summary
Sam Shikaze, a smooth private eye, narrates his own story about what happened when he was hired to find the missing Cherry Blossom Queen. He is soon trapped in a web of racism and political intrigue that seems to lead back to the Hong Kong tongs. Chuck Chan is a lawyer who tried to help solve the case, while Nancy Wing is a beautiful reporter who is searching for a story. Captain Kadota, an old friend of Sam's, offers his aid as a member of the police force, although Sam and Kadota do not see eye-to-eye on politics.

Characters and actors in the premier production

Sam Shikaze (Donald Li)
Rosie (Carol Honda)
Goldberg (James Jenner)
Chuck Chan (Henry Yuk)
Nancy Wing (Freda Foh Shen)
Sergeant Mackenzie (Jeffrey Spolan)
Capt. Kenji Kadota (Ernest Abuba)
Superintendent Jameson (James Jenner)

Presented by the Pan Asian Repertory Theater: 
Raul Aranasm, stage director
Tisa Chang, artistic director
Susan Socolowski, administrative director

Awards and honors
 1982: Bay Area Theater Circle Critics Award 
 1982: "Bernie" for new play from the San Francisco Chronicle 
 1983: Obie Award to Ernest Abuba for performance

References

External links
http://www.panasianrep.org
http://www.panasianrep.org/panasian/pastplays.htm
http://www.nytimes.com/1982/12/02/theater/theater-yellow-fever-by-the-pan-asian-rep.html

1982 plays
Canadian plays